Hellinsia ishiyamanus is a moth of the family Pterophoridae that is known from Japan (Hokkaido, Honshu), Korea and China.

The larvae feed on Artemisia vulgaris. They fold a cleft leaf of the host plant to form a tent-like structure. They eat the folded leaf from the inside, leaving the upper epidermis untouched. A single larva may fold one or two leaves.

References

External links
Taxonomic And Biological Studies Of Pterophoridae Of Japan (Lepidoptera)
Japanese Moths

ishiyamanus
Plume moths of Asia
Moths of Asia
Moths of Japan
Moths of Korea
Moths described in 1931
Taxa named by Shōnen Matsumura